Benjamin Coker may refer to:

Benjamin Coker House, Massachusetts 
Ben Coker, footballer